McMeen is a surname. Notable people with the surname include:

El McMeen (born 1947), American guitarist
Marilyn McMeen Miller Brown (born 1938), American writer

See also
McKeen (surname)
McMeel